Iqbal Sobhan Chowdhury (1 April 1949) is a Bangladeshi journalist and editor of The Daily Observer. He served as the Media and Information Affairs advisor to Prime Minister of Bangladesh, Sheikh Hasina for almost 5 years.

Career
Iqbal Sobhan did his M.A. in public administration at the University of Dhaka. He serves as the editor of The Daily Observer. He was ex president of Bangladesh Federal Union of Journalists. He served as a member of Bangladesh Film Censor Board, Bangladesh Press Council, and National Education Policy Draft Committee. He is the chairman of the Mohammadi Group. He was the current media and information affairs advisor to Prime Minister Sheikh Hasina. He was appointed the advisor on 11 July 2013. He has also said it is not possible for Bangladesh government to rule out terrorism in the Rohingya community.

Controversy
Iqbal Sobhan was sued by Awami League members of parliament Enamul Haque and Nizam Uddin Hazari. The Feni district unit of Bangladesh Awami league alleged he was responsible for the press conference by Azharul Haque Arju that blamed Awami League for the attack on Khaleda Zia's convoy in Feni.

References

Awami League politicians
Living people
University of Dhaka alumni
1949 births